Scott Winant  is an  American television director and producer. He is a member of the Directors Guild of America and Producers Guild of America. Since 1996, Winant’s production company, Twilight Time Films, has sold dozens of television projects to all the major networks. He is the son of character actor H.M. Wynant and casting director Ethel Winant.

Filmography

Film

Television

Awards and nominations

References

BozemanFilm | HATCH Experience

External links

American television directors
American television producers
Living people
Primetime Emmy Award winners
Place of birth missing (living people)
Year of birth missing (living people)